Forsythia ovata ( manlihwa), the Korean forsythia or early forsythia, is a species of flowering plant in the family Oleaceae, native to the Korean Peninsula.

References

Forsythieae
Endemic flora of Korea
Plants described in 1917